Volleyball events were contested at the 1986 Asian Games at Hanyang University Gymnasium in Seoul, South Korea from 21 September to 4 October 1986.

Medalists

Medal table

Results

Men

Preliminary round

Pool A

|}

Pool B

|}

Classification 9th–12th

|}

Classification 5th–8th

|}

Final round

|}

Women

|}

References
Men's results
Women's results

 
1986 Asian Games events
1986
Asian Games
1986 Asian Games